Ser'Darius William Blain (born March 10, 1987) is a Haitian-American film and television actor. He is best known for his role as Anthony “Fridge” Johnson in the Jumanji film series, appearing in the third and fourth entries. Blain is also recognized for his portrayal of Galvin Burdette in the first season of The CW series Charmed.

Early life
Blain started acting at the age of twelve when he helped his mother rewrite the script for a school play. His mother, a middle school English and drama teacher, cast him in the lead which caused him to "catch the bug". Blain credits this with overcoming his shyness, "l was a super shy boy to the point where I’d hold on to my mother’s skirt as a little boy...I’d always watched TV and wondered what that must be like". In 2007, his girlfriend convinced him to attend Actors, Models & Talent For Christ which got him into New York Conservatory for Dramatic Arts where he met his agent DebraLynn Findon.

Career
He graduated from NYC in 2009 and since then earned roles in films such as Camp X-Ray and When the Game Stands Tall. Blain played Anthony “Fridge” Johnson in the sequel Jumanji: Welcome to the Jungle (2017), and appeared in director James Kicklighter's short film Angel of Anywhere, starring Briana Evigan and David A. Gregory.

In February 2018, Blain was cast in a regular role for the first season of The CW's fantasy drama series Charmed, a reboot of the 1998 series of the same name. The reboot "centers on three sisters in a college town who discover they are witches." Blain played the role of Galvin, a scientist and the boyfriend of Macy Vaughn (played by Madeleine Mantock), one of the sisters in the series.

Filmography

Film

Television

Video games

References

External links
 
 

1987 births
Living people
21st-century American male actors
American male film actors
American male television actors
American male voice actors
Place of birth missing (living people)
Haitian-American male actors
African-American male actors
21st-century African-American people
20th-century African-American people